Björlanda is a locality situated in Göteborg Municipality, Västra Götaland County, Sweden. It had 608 inhabitants in 2010.

The Björlanda Church was built in the 14th century.

References 

Populated places in Västra Götaland County
Populated places in Gothenburg Municipality